Moscow City Duma District 13 is one of 45 constituencies in Moscow City Duma. The constituency has covered parts of North-Eastern Moscow since 2014. From 1993-2005 District 13 was based in Eastern Moscow; from 2005-2009 the constituency was based in South-Western and Western Moscow (it actually overlapped the entirety of State Duma Universitetsky constituency), while from 2009-2014 — in South-Western Moscow.

Members elected

Election results

2001

|-
! colspan=2 style="background-color:#E9E9E9;text-align:left;vertical-align:top;" |Candidate
! style="background-color:#E9E9E9;text-align:left;vertical-align:top;" |Party
! style="background-color:#E9E9E9;text-align:right;" |Votes
! style="background-color:#E9E9E9;text-align:right;" |%
|-
|style="background-color:"|
|align=left|Vitaly Kovalevsky (incumbent)
|align=left|Independent
|
|29.45%
|-
|style="background-color:#1042A5"|
|align=left|Pyotr Pokrevsky
|align=left|Union of Right Forces
|
|18.78%
|-
|style="background-color:"|
|align=left|Yury Polyanin
|align=left|Independent
|
|9.92%
|-
|style="background-color:"|
|align=left|Vladimir Ivanov
|align=left|Liberal Democratic Party
|
|9.92%
|-
|style="background-color:"|
|align=left|Nikolay Bukhovets
|align=left|Independent
|
|7.56%
|-
|style="background-color:"|
|align=left|Sergey Kolotnev
|align=left|Independent
|
|4.92%
|-
|style="background-color:#000000"|
|colspan=2 |against all
|
|13.53%
|-
| colspan="5" style="background-color:#E9E9E9;"|
|- style="font-weight:bold"
| colspan="3" style="text-align:left;" | Total
| 
| 100%
|-
| colspan="5" style="background-color:#E9E9E9;"|
|- style="font-weight:bold"
| colspan="4" |Source:
|
|}

2005

|-
! colspan=2 style="background-color:#E9E9E9;text-align:left;vertical-align:top;" |Candidate
! style="background-color:#E9E9E9;text-align:left;vertical-align:top;" |Party
! style="background-color:#E9E9E9;text-align:right;" |Votes
! style="background-color:#E9E9E9;text-align:right;" |%
|-
|style="background-color:"|
|align=left|Vladimir Platonov (incumbent)
|align=left|United Russia
|
|37.83%
|-
|style="background-color:"|
|align=left|Nikolay Gubenko
|align=left|Communist Party
|
|27.94%
|-
|style="background-color:"|
|align=left|Ilya Yashin
|align=left|Yabloko-United Democrats
|
|14.17%
|-
|style="background-color:"|
|align=left|Aleksey Gladkov
|align=left|Russian Party of Life
|
|4.67%
|-
|style="background-color:"|
|align=left|Aleksandr Kobrinsky
|align=left|Liberal Democratic Party
|
|3.93%
|-
|style="background-color:#DD137B"|
|align=left|Svetlana Potapova
|align=left|Social Democratic Party
|
|3.05%
|-
|style="background-color:"|
|align=left|Mikhail Lipsky
|align=left|Agrarian Party
|
|1.27%
|-
|style="background-color:"|
|align=left|Vladimir Goldenberg
|align=left|Independent
|
|1.16%
|-
| colspan="5" style="background-color:#E9E9E9;"|
|- style="font-weight:bold"
| colspan="3" style="text-align:left;" | Total
| 
| 100%
|-
| colspan="5" style="background-color:#E9E9E9;"|
|- style="font-weight:bold"
| colspan="4" |Source:
|
|}

2009

|-
! colspan=2 style="background-color:#E9E9E9;text-align:left;vertical-align:top;" |Candidate
! style="background-color:#E9E9E9;text-align:left;vertical-align:top;" |Party
! style="background-color:#E9E9E9;text-align:right;" |Votes
! style="background-color:#E9E9E9;text-align:right;" |%
|-
|style="background-color:"|
|align=left|Anton Paleyev
|align=left|United Russia
|
|58.18%
|-
|style="background-color:"|
|align=left|Sergey Mitropolsky
|align=left|Communist Party
|
|20.56%
|-
|style="background-color:"|
|align=left|Yevgeny Romanov
|align=left|Independent
|
|9.14%
|-
|style="background-color:"|
|align=left|Vladimir Lyagushin
|align=left|Liberal Democratic Party
|
|7.65%
|-
| colspan="5" style="background-color:#E9E9E9;"|
|- style="font-weight:bold"
| colspan="3" style="text-align:left;" | Total
| 
| 100%
|-
| colspan="5" style="background-color:#E9E9E9;"|
|- style="font-weight:bold"
| colspan="4" |Source:
|
|}

2014

|-
! colspan=2 style="background-color:#E9E9E9;text-align:left;vertical-align:top;" |Candidate
! style="background-color:#E9E9E9;text-align:left;vertical-align:top;" |Party
! style="background-color:#E9E9E9;text-align:right;" |Votes
! style="background-color:#E9E9E9;text-align:right;" |%
|-
|style="background-color:"|
|align=left|Tatyana Portnova (incumbent)
|align=left|United Russia
|
|45.02%
|-
|style="background-color:"|
|align=left|Svetlana Savitskaya
|align=left|Yabloko
|
|14.46%
|-
|style="background-color:"|
|align=left|Nikolay Morozov
|align=left|A Just Russia
|
|13.25%
|-
|style="background-color:"|
|align=left|Rodion Shaizhanov
|align=left|Communist Party
|
|12.98%
|-
|style="background-color:"|
|align=left|Sergey Dobrynin
|align=left|Liberal Democratic Party
|
|7.16%
|-
|style="background-color:"|
|align=left|Sergey Lebedev
|align=left|Independent
|
|3.88%
|-
| colspan="5" style="background-color:#E9E9E9;"|
|- style="font-weight:bold"
| colspan="3" style="text-align:left;" | Total
| 
| 100%
|-
| colspan="5" style="background-color:#E9E9E9;"|
|- style="font-weight:bold"
| colspan="4" |Source:
|
|}

2019

|-
! colspan=2 style="background-color:#E9E9E9;text-align:left;vertical-align:top;" |Candidate
! style="background-color:#E9E9E9;text-align:left;vertical-align:top;" |Party
! style="background-color:#E9E9E9;text-align:right;" |Votes
! style="background-color:#E9E9E9;text-align:right;" |%
|-
|style="background-color:"|
|align=left|Igor Buskin
|align=left|Independent
|
|31.89%
|-
|style="background-color:"|
|align=left|Ilya Lifantsev
|align=left|A Just Russia
|
|25.61%
|-
|style="background-color:"|
|align=left|Aleksandr Potapov
|align=left|Communist Party
|
|25.32%
|-
|style="background-color:"|
|align=left|Tatyana Kravchenko
|align=left|Liberal Democratic Party
|
|9.26%
|-
|style="background-color:"|
|align=left|Denis Zommer
|align=left|Communists of Russia
|
|4.46%
|-
| colspan="5" style="background-color:#E9E9E9;"|
|- style="font-weight:bold"
| colspan="3" style="text-align:left;" | Total
| 
| 100%
|-
| colspan="5" style="background-color:#E9E9E9;"|
|- style="font-weight:bold"
| colspan="4" |Source:
|
|}

Notes

References

Moscow City Duma districts